The New Zealand Fringe Festival is an open access arts festival in Wellington, New Zealand held over several weeks in February and March each year. The 2020 programme marked the festival's 30th anniversary.

Background 
The festival was established in 1990 and was the first fringe festival in New Zealand. It followed fringe festival models from Edinburgh and Adelaide. The first festival was held at BATS Theatre. Initially it ran as a biennial festival to coincide with the New Zealand Festival of the Arts and was also curated by them until the Fringe Arts Trust (FAT) was formed in 1994.

The current governance is the Creative Capital Arts Trust, an umbrella organisation established in 2011 to manage New Zealand Fringe Festival and the Wellington street festival CubaDupa. Since 2011, NZ Fringe has grown 237.5% from 52 shows to 189 shows in 2022. The non-profit organisation is governed by a voluntary board of five trustees. Staff have included Drew James (Chief Executive), Gerry Paul (CubaDupa Festival Director), and Vanessa Stacey (New Zealand Fringe Festival Director ).

Programme 
New Zealand Fringe is an open access festival, providing various platforms for artists to experiment, present, and show new or refined works.  The festival is held annually for three weeks during February/March. The festival often has over 150 events with can include more than 600 presentations over the three week season. It includes contemporary work in art forms including audio (podcast), busking, cabaret, comedy, circus, dance, improvisation, music, online, physical theatre, poetry, puppetry, spoken word/storytelling, theatre, visual & digital art. New Zealand Fringe directed by Vanessa Stacey and is produced and managed by the non-profit Creative Capital Arts Trust, with Drew James as Chief Executive and a team of professional arts managers and seasonal staff.

Participation
As an open access there are no constraints on the content or presentation of the work. Participating artists pay a one-off registration fee and the New Zealand Fringe assists the artists by providing festival marketing (website, fringe programme, marketing collateral), practical information, and one-on-one advice. As a non-commissioned, open access festival, the production and presentation costs are the responsibility of the practitioner.

New Zealand Fringe Festival runs a Kakano New Works Funding scheme to foster and support new New Zealand productions. There are international festival relationships to create exchange and touring opportunities to New Zealand artists.

Accolades
In January 2014, National Geographic named NZ Fringe Festival one of 10 international ‘Must Do in February Festivals’. Vibrant Gold Awards Finalist 2022

In November 2014 NZ Fringe Festival won the Wellington International Airport Regional Community Award for Arts and Culture.

Alumni 
Many New Zealand arts and entertainment practitioners and companies have had shows at the New Zealand Fringe including, Flight of the Conchords, Rhys Darby, Strike Percussion, and Footnote Dance.

References

Festivals in Wellington
Fringe festivals in New Zealand
Tourist attractions in the Wellington Region
Arts festivals in New Zealand